Sepiidae is a family of cephalopods in the order Sepiida.

Classification

Order Sepiida: cuttlefish
Family Sepiadariidae
Family Sepiidae
Genus Metasepia
Metasepia pfefferi, flamboyant cuttlefish
Metasepia tullbergi, paintpot cuttlefish
Genus Sepia
Subgenus undetermined
? Sepia bartletti
? Sepia baxteri *
? Sepia dannevigi *
? Sepia elliptica, ovalbone cuttlefish
Sepia filibrachia
Sepia mira
Sepia plana
Sepia senta
Sepia subplana
? Sepia whitleyana
Subgenus Acanthosepion
Sepia aculeata,  needle cuttlefish
Sepia brevimana, shortclub cuttlefish
Sepia esculenta, golden cuttlefish
Sepia lycidas,  kisslip cuttlefish
Sepia prashadi, hooded cuttlefish 
Sepia recurvirostra, curvespine cuttlefish
Sepia savignyi, broadback cuttlefish 
Sepia smithi, Smith's cuttlefish 
Sepia stellifera
Sepia thurstoni
Sepia vecchioni 
Sepia zanzibarica
Subgenus Anomalosepia
Sepia australis, southern cuttlefish 
Sepia omani, Oman cuttlefish
Sepia sulcata, grooved cuttlefish
Subgenus Doratosepion
Sepia adami
Sepia andreana, Andrea cuttlefish
Sepia appellofi
Sepia arabica, Arabian cuttlefish
Sepia aureomaculata
Sepia bathyalis
Sepia bidhaia
Sepia braggi, slender cuttlefish
Sepia burnupi
Sepia carinata
Sepia confusa
Sepia cottoni
Sepia elongata
Sepia erostrata
Sepia foliopeza
Sepia incerta
Sepia ivanovi
Sepia joubini
Sepia kiensis *
Sepia kobiensis, Kobi cuttlefish 
Sepia koilados
Sepia limata
Sepia longipes, longarm cuttlefish
Sepia lorigera, spider cuttlefish
Sepia mascarensis
Sepia mirabilis
Sepia murrayi, frog cuttlefish
Sepia pardex
Sepia peterseni
Sepia rhoda
Sepia saya
Sepia sewelli
Sepia sokotriensis
Sepia subtenuipes
Sepia tala
Sepia tanybracheia
Sepia tenuipes
Sepia tokioensis
Sepia trygonina, trident cuttlefish
Sepia vercoi
Sepia vietnamica
Subgenus Hemisepius
Sepia dubia
Sepia faurei
Sepia pulchra
Sepia robsoni
Sepia typica
Subgenus Rhombosepion
Sepia acuminata
Sepia cultrata, knifebone cuttlefish
Sepia elegans, elegant cuttlefish
Sepia hedleyi, Hedley's cuttlefish
Sepia hieronis
Sepia madokai, Madokai's cuttlefish
? Sepia opipara
Sepia orbignyana, pink cuttlefish
Sepia reesi
Sepia rex
Sepia vossi
Subgenus Sepia
Sepia angulata *
Sepia apama, giant Australian cuttlefish 
Sepia bandensis, stumpy-spined cuttlefish
Sepia bertheloti, African cuttlefish
Sepia chirotrema
Sepia dollfusi
Sepia elobyana, Guinean cuttlefish
Sepia gibba
Sepia hierredda
Sepia insignis
Sepia irvingi
Sepia latimanus, broadclub cuttlefish
Sepia mestus, reaper cuttlefish
Sepia novaehollandiae, New Holland cuttlefish
Sepia officinalis, common cuttlefish
Sepia papillata
Sepia papuensis, Papuan cuttlefish
Sepia pharaonis, Pharaoh cuttlefish 
Sepia plangon, mourning cuttlefish
Sepia plathyconchalis
Sepia ramani
Sepia rozella, rosecone cuttlefish
Sepia simoniana
Sepia tuberculata
Sepia vermiculata
Genus Sepiella
Sepiella cyanea
Sepiella inermis, spineless cuttlefish
Sepiella japonica, Japanese spineless cuttlefish
Sepiella mangkangunga
Sepiella ocellata
Sepiella ornata, ornate cuttlefish
Sepiella weberi

The species listed above with an asterisk (*) are questionable and need further study to determine if they are a valid species or a synonym. The question mark (?) indicates questionable placement within the genus.

References

External links

TONMO.com Sepiidae forum

Cuttlefish
Cephalopod families